Masae Kasai (河西 昌枝 Kasai Masae, 14 July 1933 – 3 October 2013) was a volleyball player from Japan, who was a member of the Japan Women's National Team, Oriental Witches, that won the gold medal at the 1964 Summer Olympics.

Masae Kasai was born in Minami-Alps, Yamanashi, and started playing volleyball when the sport was still played with nine players a side in Japan (six are used internationally). She joined the Nichibo fiber spinning company right out of high school, first playing for corporation's Ashikaga (Tochigi) team, later for the one from Kaizuka (Osaka). The latter team dominated the women's sport in the late 1950s and 1960s, and when the Japanese started playing according to international rules, Nichibo Kaizuka's players formed the national team. Kasai and her team mates débuted at the 1960 World Championships, finishing behind the Soviet Union. Two years later, the Japanese won the title, defeating the Soviet squad before a Moscow audience. When volleyball made its Olympic début in Tokyo, they lived up to high expectations by again beating the Soviet Union in the final round-robin match, in straight sets. After the Olympics, team captain Masae Kasai met with the Japanese Prime Minister and complained to him that she had not been able to find a husband because of the difficult training regimen. The Prime Minister set her up with a date and the two later married. She later went on to become a volleyball coach in Japan and China, and sat on the board of the Japanese Volleyball Association. In 2008, she was inducted into the Volleyball Hall of Fame.

Masae Kasai (who changed her last name to Nakamura after she married) died on October 3, 2013, in Tokyo from intracranial hemorrhage.

References

External links

 Video of the moments of victory and of awarding gold medal in 1964 Tokyo Olympics（the person who receives gold medal, bending down）
 Masae Kasai passed away at 80.
sports-reference

1933 births
2013 deaths
Sportspeople from Yamanashi Prefecture
Volleyball players at the 1964 Summer Olympics
Olympic volleyball players of Japan
Japanese women's volleyball players
Olympic medalists in volleyball
Medalists at the 1964 Summer Olympics
Olympic gold medalists for Japan